Henry Allen Cooper (September 8, 1850 – March 1, 1931) was a U.S. Representative from Wisconsin.

Early life 
Cooper was born in Spring Prairie, Wisconsin, son of former Free Soil Party State Representative Joel H. Cooper, a physician. In 1851 the family moved to Burlington, Wisconsin. Their house was a station of the Underground Railroad, and in 1852 sheltered fugitive slave Joshua Cooper on his way to Canada. Henry Cooper graduated from Burlington High School in June 1869. After school, Cooper attended Northwestern University in Evanston, Illinois, and graduated in 1873. He then attended Union College of Law, then the legal faculty of Northwestern University and graduated there in 1875. He was then admitted to the bar, practiced in Chicago until 1879 and then commenced practice at Burlington.

Cooper was elected District Attorney of Racine County in November 1880 and moved to Racine in January 1881. In 1882 and 1884 he was reelected as District Attorney without opposition.

Political career 
In 1884, Cooper served as a delegate to the Republican National Convention, a tradition he would continue in 1908 and 1924. He was subsequently elected to District 3 of the Wisconsin State Senate for the term 1887 to 1889 and authored a bill to introduce the secret ballot in Wisconsin. In 1890 Cooper unsuccessfully ran for election to the fifty-second Congress.

In 1892, Cooper was elected as a Republican Congressman to the fifty-third Congress, an office he assumed on March 4, 1893, that year. He represented Wisconsin's 1st congressional district. During his time as Congressman, Cooper served as the chairman of the Committee of Rivers and Harbors for the fifty-fifth Congress and the Committee on Insular Affairs for the fifty-sixth Congress through to the sixtieth Congress.

He was also the author of the Philippine Organic Act (1902), and read out the poem Mi último adiós by José Rizal as part of successfully persuading his fellow congressmen to vote for the act. Cooper provided key support for the 1910 bill authorizing construction of the Lincoln Memorial.

On April 5, 1917, he was one of 50 representatives who voted against declaring war on Germany. Partly due to his opposition to American involvement in World War I, Cooper failed to gain reelection to his seat in 1918, finishing his term on March 3, 1919. Overall serving from the Fifty-third Congress to the Sixty-fifth Congress.

After missing a term of Congress, Cooper was once again elected to represent Wisconsin's 1st district in the Sixty-seventh Congress in 1920 and to the five succeeding Congresses. He served until his death in Washington D.C. on March 1, 1931, which came before he could start his new term (in the seventy-second Congress). He was buried in Mound Cemetery, Racine, Wisconsin.

See also
List of United States Congress members who died in office (1900–49)

Sources

Cooper, Henry Allen  - Wisconsin Historical Society

1850 births
1931 deaths
District attorneys in Wisconsin
Republican Party Wisconsin state senators
Northwestern University alumni
Northwestern University Pritzker School of Law alumni
Union College (New York) alumni
People from Burlington, Wisconsin
Republican Party members of the United States House of Representatives from Wisconsin
Illinois lawyers
People from Spring Prairie, Wisconsin
Deans of the United States House of Representatives